Eduardo Salhuana is a former member of the Congress of Peru of the Perú Posible party representing Madre de Dios. He was Minister of Justice of Peru during the Alejandro Toledo presidency.

Early life, education and career 
He attended his school studies in his hometown. In 1980 he entered the Law School of the National University of Saint Anthony the Abbot in Cuzco, graduating with a degree in Law and Political Science in 1986.

In his professional career, he was a mixed judge in Puerto Maldonado; member of the Mixed and Decentralized Chamber of Madre de Dios; legal advisor to grassroots organizations and representative unions of Madre de Dios; and Dean of the Lawyers Association of Madre de Dios (2000-2001).

Political career 
In 1990, he entered politics as a member of United Left (IU), being elected deputy for Madre de Dios, a period that was frustrated by the 1992 self-coup. In 1997 he unsuccessfully ran for mayor of the Tambopata Provincial Municipality, in a questioned election that gave the ruling candidate the winner.

After the fall of the Fujimori regime, he ran in 2001 as a candidate for the National Congress for the National United Renaissance group, winning with 40.97% of the departmental vote, the highest percentage vote at the national level. During his parliamentary function, he was a member of the Justice, Constitution and Budget commissions. He was also president of the Commission on Amazon, Indigenous and Afro-Peruvian Affairs. He was one of the promoters in declaring the South Interoceanic Highway of national interest, which he considered essential to achieve economic integration with Brazil.

On February 25, 2005 he was sworn in as Minister of Justice, replacing the resigning Carlos Gamarra Ugaz, forming part of the ministerial cabinet chaired by Carlos Ferrero. He resigned when the ministerial crisis of August 2005 occurred, which led to the fall of the Ferrero cabinet.

In 2015 he was appointed General Manager of the Madre de Dios Region.

References

External links 
Official Site
Official Page on Peruvian Congress Site

Living people
1962 births
Possible Peru politicians
Members of the Congress of the Republic of Peru
Peruvian Ministers of Justice
People from Cusco